Charles Marshall Hays (April 22, 1845 - March 14, 1917) was a local official, railroad agent, sheriff, and politician in Idaho. He served in the state senate representing Ada County, Idaho.

He was born in Saline County, Missouri. He made his way west with his father and served as a local official with him in Owyhee County. He served as a sheriff and county attorney. He bought the Idaho Avalanche newspaper in Silver City, Idaho. He was a delegate to Idaho's 1899 Constitutional Convention.

He married Rebecca L. Dye in 1868 and they had eight children. They had a home in Boise and 640 acres of land elsewhere.

References

External links
Findagrave entry

This draft is in progress as of October 18, 2022.

Idaho state senators

1845 births
1917 deaths
19th-century American newspaper editors
Idaho sheriffs
People from Owyhee County, Idaho
Editors of Idaho newspapers
District attorneys in Idaho
People from Saline County, Missouri
People from Ada County, Idaho